George Wallace Chestnut  (September 27, 1911 – September 18, 1983) was an American professional basketball player. He played for the Indianapolis Kautskys for seven seasons; during his tenure, the Kautskys were an independent team, as well as member of the Midwest Basketball Conference, before it became the National Basketball League.  During his professional career, he averaged 6.2 points per game, unfortunately, the records are incomplete.

In college, Chestnut lettered in football, basketball, and baseball for Indiana State University. He served in the United States Army during World War II for approximately 15 months.

References

1911 births
1983 deaths
American men's basketball players
United States Army personnel of World War II
Basketball players from Indiana
Centers (basketball)
Forwards (basketball)
Indiana State Sycamores baseball players
Indiana State Sycamores football players
Indiana State Sycamores men's basketball players
Indianapolis Kautskys players
Original Celtics players
People from Daviess County, Indiana
People from New Haven, Indiana
Military personnel from Indiana